Melksham Oak Community School is a mixed secondary school and sixth form located in the southeast outskirts of Melksham, Wiltshire, England, for students aged 11 to 18.

History
The school opened on 12 July 2010, having been created under the Building Schools for the Future programme to replace The George Ward Technology College.

At first a community school administered by Wiltshire Council, Melksham Oak Community School converted to academy status in April 2015. The school continues to coordinate with Wiltshire Council for admissions.

In August 2018, the school became part of the White Horse Federation, a multi-academy trust which runs primary and secondary schools in Wiltshire, Berkshire, Oxfordshire and Gloucestershire.

References

External links 
 

Secondary schools in Wiltshire
Academies in Wiltshire
Educational institutions established in 2010
Melksham
2010 establishments in England